Showtime is a type of performance Litefeet/pole dancing done as a busking routine using hand holds installed inside New York City Subway cars. Showtime includes acrobatic flips, hat and shoe tricks, and pole tricks. Estimates have placed the number of Showtime dancers in the low hundreds.

Litefeet, a type of dance that emerged from Harlem and the Bronx, succeeds  breakdancing / b-boying emerging in the 1980s. It is often done to 100-BPM tracks. Some hip-hop dancers on the subway have looked down on the common litefeet moves used by other buskers.

In March 2014, New York City Police Commissioner Bill Bratton announced that the New York City Police Department would, under the broken windows theory philosophy, prosecute quality of life crimes against Showtime and subway dancers for breaking the MTA’s policy against performing and panhandling on the trains, citing that performances have been on the upswing since 2008. Performers have been arrested for reckless endangerment. In January 2015, the TA launched a publicity campaign, Courtesy Counts, Manners Make a Better Ride, including the anti-Showtime slogan "Poles Are For Your Safety, Not Your Latest Routine", alongside other advertisements against manspreading, "pole hogging", and public nail clipping.

One collective, "WAFFLE (We are Family for Life Entertainment)", has been repeatedly profiled by media, including one of its members appearing on Season 8  of America's Got Talent.

References

External links
 "New York dance subculture litefeet featured in new documentary." February 3, 2015. Fact magazine.  
 "Litefeet: Sound of the Subway. A mini documentary about the litefeet music genre and dance style." Viewing NYC (video). 
 "Litefeet the Last Dance." Nowness Shorts (video).

Street performance
Dance in New York City
New York City Subway
Articles containing video clips